Will Sutherland (born 27 October 1999) is an Australian cricketer. He made his List A debut for Cricket Australia XI against Pakistanis during their tour of Australia on 10 January 2017. In July 2017, he took a multi-year deal with Victoria, rather than playing in the AFL. He attended Scotch College and he is the son of James Sutherland, the former CEO of Cricket Australia.

In December 2017, he was named as the vice captain of Australia's squad for the 2018 Under-19 Cricket World Cup. In March 2018, he won the Commonwealth Bank Future Star Award at Cricket Victoria awards ceremony.

He made his Twenty20 debut for Melbourne Renegades in the 2018–19 Big Bash League season on 20 December 2018. In only his second game of the 2019–20 Marsh One-Day Cup, Sutherland was Man of the Match with the bowling figures of 2/43 and followed up by making his maiden List- A half century scoring 54 runs guiding his team to a 1 run victory.

He made his first-class debut on 12 November 2019, for Victoria in the 2019–20 Sheffield Shield season. In February 2020, in the round eight match against Queensland, Sutherland took his maiden five-wicket haul in first-class cricket, with 5/34. A year later, Sutherland was named the Bradman Young Cricketer of the Year at the 2021 Australian Cricket Awards.

References

External links
 

1999 births
Living people
Australian cricketers
Cricket Australia XI cricketers
Melbourne Renegades cricketers
Victoria cricketers
Cricketers from Melbourne
People from East Melbourne